Davide Costa (born 22 March 1996) is an Italian footballer.

Club career
He made his professional debut in the Lega Pro for Bassano Virtus on 13 February 2016 in a game against Cuneo.

References

External links
 

1996 births
People from Bassano del Grappa
Living people
Italian footballers
Italy youth international footballers
Bassano Virtus 55 S.T. players
L.R. Vicenza players
Serie C players
Serie B players
Association football goalkeepers
F.C. Rieti players
Virtus Francavilla Calcio players
Sportspeople from the Province of Vicenza
Footballers from Veneto